Sharaf al-Zamān Ṭāhir al-Marwazī or Marvazī (fl. 1056/57–1124/25 CE) was a physician and author of Nature of Animals.

He was a native of Merv, part of the Khorasan region in modern day Turkmenistan.

Nature of Animals
Al-Marwazī drew upon the works of Aristotle, Dioscorides, Galen, Oribasius, Timotheos of Gaza, Paul of Aegina, and the Muslim scholar Al-Jahiz. The work comprises five parts:
 On human beings
 On domestic and wild quadrupeds
 On land and marine birds
 On venomous creatures 
 On marine animals

Physician
Al-Marwazi served as physician at the courts of the Seljuk Sultan Malik-Shah I and his successors. As a physician, he recorded observations of parasitic worms.

References

People from Merv
Zoologists of the medieval Islamic world
11th-century Iranian physicians
Court physicians
12th-century Iranian physicians